is a Japanese children's book series created by Yutaka Hara and published by Poplar Publishing. The original books were also made into an OVA, animated feature-length films, anime, and comics.

Synopsis

Set in a parallel world inhabited by anthropomorphic animals (in their Earth's version of Japan), the story follows the protagonist, a fox named Zorori and his twin boar bandit apprentices Ishishi and Noshishi as they travel from place to place. The series debuted in 1987 with its first issue:  and has published about two issues per year, totaling 70 issues as of December 2021. It was adapted into an anime series from February 1, 2004 to January 28, 2007. A Hong Kong produced English dubbed version by Red Angel Media aired on Cartoon Network Philippines on January 4, 2010.

Zorori was originally a villain for the series  written by Shiho Mitsushima, and when Hōrensō Man ended, Shiho Mitsushima understood the need to give it an independent spin-off. Another part is the reoccurring characters (Zorori Mama and Yōkai Gakkō no Sensei, and to some degree the debut of Sumire and Bokushi Robo) that were not given anything past trivial appearances. However, knowing the background story of the Hōrensō Man series is not needed to be able to enjoy the Zorori series.

Using clear patterns and lines, the characters would speak using speech bubbles more similar to comics than to picture books. The text and words would not use any difficult kanji or any furigana, instead using lower grade level words so that it can be read alone without needing any help. It also features excessive puns and it is because of this that puns saw a boom in use in elementary school students. In spite of it being called a well read elementary school "children's book", it has an array of farting, belching, and vulgar words that sometimes parents and guardians in the PTA demanded apologies for it. Whenever Zorori is in a desperate situation and it appears he'll reach his demise, a fake notice is posted advising to skip the next page due to gruesome violence (Of course this is all a joke. The next page just has him finding a way out of his predicament).

Furthermore, the Spanish word for fox is "zorro", and the author intended for Kaiketsu Zorori to resemble Zorro.

List of volumes
The first Zorori book was released in November 1987 and has seen two releases per year ever since. The first 39 volumes have been used as source material for the anime, while volumes 40 and beyond are book only, due to being printed after the anime's cancellation.

Anime

Manga
BunBun Comics published 10 volumes of a manga series featuring Kaiketsu Zorori in famous fairy tales and folk tales. It was written by Yutaka Hara and illustrated by Hiroki Kimura.

Theme Songs

Kaiketsu Zorori
Opening Theme
  by Kōichi Yamadera
Ending Themes
  by Satō-san and Suzuki-kun (Little by Little) (ep. 1~13)
  by Yukie 6 & Nobita Robert (ep. 14~31)
  by Satō-san and Suzuki-kun (Little by Little) (ep. 32~46)
  by Sayuri Anzu (ep. 47~52)

Majime ni Fumajime Kaiketsu Zorori
Opening Themes
  by Kōichi Yamadera, Rikako Aikawa, and Motoko Kumai (ep. 1~50)
  by Kōichi Yamadera (ep. 51~97)

Ending Themes
  by Sakiko Tamagawa (ep. 1~27)
  by Junko Iwao (ep. 28~50)
  by Rikako Aikawa and Motoko Kumai (ep. 51~74)
  by Kōichi Yamadera (ep. 75~97)

Motto! Majime ni Fumajime Kaiketsu Zorori
Opening Theme
  by Kōichi Yamadera (ep. 1~50)
  by Kōichi Yamadera (ep. 51~75)

Ending Themes
  by ONEPIXCEL (ep. 1~25)
 ZORORI ROCK!!! by Yabai T-Shirts Yasan (ep. 26~75)

References

External links

 Manga official site 
 Anime official Site 
 

1987 manga
2004 anime television series debuts
2005 anime television series debuts
Ajia-do Animation Works
Animated films about foxes
Animated television series about foxes
Animax original programming
Bandai Namco franchises
Bandai Namco Pictures
Children's manga
NHK original programming
Shōnen manga
Sunrise (company)
TMS Entertainment